Hossam Al-Jadaani (born 28 June 1989) is a football player who plays for Al-Rayyan as defender.

External links 
 

1989 births
Living people
Al-Ahli Saudi FC players
Damac FC players
Al-Taawoun FC players
Najran SC players
Khaleej FC players
Al-Nahda Club (Saudi Arabia) players
Al-Sahel SC (Saudi Arabia) players
Al-Ansar FC (Medina) players
Al-Rayyan Club (Saudi Arabia) players
Saudi Arabian footballers
Saudi Second Division players
Saudi First Division League players
Saudi Professional League players
Association football defenders